The Swiss hockey 2013–14 National League B season was played from September 2013 to February 2014. 10 teams participated in the league, and EHC Visp won the championship.

Participating Teams

Regular Season Standings

Playoffs

League Qualification

External links
  National League B, official website
  National League B, official website

National League B seasons
2
Swiss